The 150th (York and Durham) Brigade was a formation of the Territorial Force of the British Army. It was assigned to the 50th (Northumbrian) Division and served on the Western Front during the First World War.

Order of Battle
 1/4th Battalion, East Yorkshire Regiment
 1/4th Battalion, Yorkshire Regiment (Green Howards)
 1/5th Battalion, Yorkshire Regiment (Green Howards)
 1/5th Battalion, Durham Light Infantry
 2nd Battalion, Northumberland Fusiliers
 7th Battalion, Wiltshire Regiment
 2nd Battalion, Royal Munster Fusiliers  
 150th Machine Gun Company 
 150th Trench Mortar Battery

References

Infantry brigades of the British Army in World War I
Military units and formations established in 1908